This is a list of VMI Keydets baseball seasons. The VMI Keydets baseball team represents the Virginia Military Institute in the Big South Conference of the NCAA's Division I. The Keydets have played their home games at Gray–Minor Stadium since 2007. Though the team has been around since 1866, statistics and records date only as far back as 1950.

VMI has yet to win a conference tournament championship in any conference, and has yet to earn a berth in the NCAA Division I Baseball Championship.

Season results

Notes

Statistics
Statistics correct as of the end of the 2018 season.

References

VMI
VMI Keydets baseball seasons